Entreat is a live album by British alternative rock band The Cure, recorded at London's Wembley Arena in July 1989. It consists entirely of songs performed from the band's 1989 record Disintegration; while they were on their international Prayer tour. Initially, Entreat was distributed exclusively in France as a promotional tool in 1989 and then was given away free by HMV stores in the UK and Ireland to customers who purchased two CDs from the band's back catalogue in May 1990. It was then given a full commercial release in March 1991.

The last two tracks were released in 1989 as B-sides to the US version of "Lullaby". "Fascination Street", "Last Dance", "Prayers For Rain", and "Disintegration" were also included as B-sides on the "Pictures of You" CD single.

The re-release of Disintegration in 2010 featured a remastered and remixed version of Entreat, entitled Entreat Plus because it featured all twelve songs from the album, including the four excluded from the original. It was the first time the album was released worldwide, though it had already been released on CD before.

Track listing
 "Pictures of You" – 7:08
 "Closedown" – 4:23
 "Last Dance" – 4:41
 "Fascination Street" – 5:20
 "Prayers for Rain" – 4:49
 "Disintegration" – 7:41
 "Homesick" – 6:49
 "Untitled" – 6:33

Entreat Plus
"Plainsong" – 5:19
"Pictures of You" – 7:04
"Closedown" – 4:22
"Lovesong" – 3:24
"Last Dance" – 4:37
"Lullaby" – 4:14
"Fascination Street" – 5:10
"Prayers for Rain" – 4:50
"The Same Deep Water as You" – 10:03
"Disintegration" – 7:54
"Homesick" – 6:47
"Untitled" – 6:45

Personnel
Robert Smith – vocals, guitar, six-string bass
Simon Gallup – bass guitar
Porl Thompson – guitar
Boris Williams – drums
Roger O'Donnell – keyboards

References

The Cure live albums
1991 live albums
Fiction Records live albums